Rhamnus persica is a species of plant in the family Rhamnaceae.

References

persica
Taxa named by Pierre Edmond Boissier